Austrogammarus is a genus of crustacean in family Paramelitidae. It contains the following species:
Austrogammarus australis (Sayce, 1901)
Austrogammarus haasei (Sayce, 1902)
Austrogammarus multispinatus Williams & Barnard, 1988
Austrogammarus saycei Williams & Barnard, 1988
Austrogammarus smithi Williams & Barnard, 1988
Austrogammarus spinatus Williams & Barnard, 1988
Austrogammarus telsosetosus Bradbury & Williams, 1995

References

Gammaridea
Taxonomy articles created by Polbot